| points = 
| tries = 
| topscorer-flag = Samoa
| topscorer-flagvar= 
| topscorer = Stephen Crichton (73)
| top try scorer-flag = Australia
| top try scorer-flagvar = 
| top try scorer = Josh Addo-Carr (12 tries)
| tournaments = Rugby League World Cup
| last = 2017
| next = 2025
}}
The 2021 Men's Rugby League World Cup, was the 16th Rugby League World Cup, and one of three major tournaments of the 2021 Rugby League World Cup. The tournament was held in England from 15 October 2022 to 19 November 2022. It was originally due to be held between 23 October 2021 and 27 November 2021, but the COVID-19 pandemic and the subsequent withdrawals of Australia and New Zealand caused the tournament to be postponed. 16 teams competed in the tournament, an increase of two from the previous two tournaments and the first to feature 16 teams since the 2000 Rugby League World Cup.

For the first time, the Rugby League World Cup was run alongside the women's and wheelchair tournaments with all participants being paid the same, while all 61 matches in the three tournaments were broadcast live.

Australia beat Samoa 30–10 in the final to win the tournament for the third successive time, extending their record number of World Cup titles to twelve.

Teams

Qualification

The eight quarter-finalists of the previous tournament in 2017 earned automatic qualification to the 2021 tournament. As such, the allocations were confirmed as 6 teams from Europe (excluding hosts), 6 from Asia-Pacific, 1 from Middle East-Africa, 1 from the Americas, and 1 from an inter-regional play-off. Qualification began on 16 June 2018, and concluded on 16 November 2019.

Draw 
The draw was originally scheduled to be finalised on 27 November 2019, exactly two years before the date of the tournament final, however, it was postponed until 16 January 2020. The draw was made at Buckingham Palace on 16 January 2020 and was streamed live on Facebook. Teams from pot 1 were drawn by Prince Harry, Duke of Sussex, pot 2 by Katherine Grainger, and pot 3 by Jason Robinson.

The draw resulted in the following teams being drawn into the following groups. Each group had to have at least one team from the Pacific region. As such, Lebanon were not eligible to be drawn into Group A from pot 1.

Squads 

From September 2022, teams announced wider squads of up to 38 players, which were reduced to 24 before the beginning of the tournament.

Venues

Stadium locations
Seventeen venues were used for the men's tournament.

Team base camp locations 
13 base camps were used by the 16 national squads to stay and train before and during the World Cup tournament, as follow:

 Australia: Manchester
 Cook Islands: Tees Valley
 England: Manchester
 Fiji: Kingston upon Hull
 France: Bolton
 Greece: Sheffield
 Ireland: Leeds
 Italy: St Helens
 Jamaica: Leeds
 Lebanon: Leigh
 New Zealand: York
 Papua New Guinea: Warrington
 Samoa: Doncaster
 Scotland: Newcastle upon Tyne
 Tonga: St Helens
 Wales: Preston

Officiating

Match officials
The list of match officials who officiated across both the men's and women's tournaments was published on 5 October 2022.

  Grant Atkins (Australia)
  Kasey Badger (Australia)
  Dean Bowmer (England)
  Ben Casty (France)
  James Child (England)
  Darian Furner (Australia)
  Adam Gee (Australia)
  Tom Grant (England)
  Marcus Griffiths (England)
  Robert Hicks (England)
  Neil Horton (England)
  Chris Kendall (England)
  Ashley Klein (Australia)
  Aaron Moore (England)

  Liam Moore (England)
  Paki Parkinson (New Zealand)
  Geoffrey Poumes (France)
  Wyatt Raymond (Australia)
  Liam Rush (England)
  Belinda Sharpe (Australia)
  Michael Smaill (England)
  Jack Smith (England)
  Todd Smith (Australia)
  Gerard Sutton (Australia)
  Rochelle Tamarua (New Zealand)
  Ben Thaler (England)
  Warren Turley (England)
  James Vella (England)

On-field rules and disciplinary measures
Matches were played to the International Rugby League (IRL) rules. Certain differences between the way the rules of Australia and Europe were clarified in September 2022. All drop goals were worth one point and all play the ball infringements resulted in a set restart. Introduced from the Australian National Rugby League (NRL) was the "captain's challenge" where under certain circumstances a team captain was able to ask for the referee's decision to be reviewed. Head injury assessments and subsequent treatment followed the European model.

A new match review panel comprising members from both the RFL and NRL was established for the tournament to deal with disciplinary issues.

Warm-up matches 
Pre-tournament practice matches took place on 7 and 8 October, the weekend before the first round of group stage matches of the World Cup.

Group stage 

Competing countries were divided into four groups of four teams (groups A to D). Teams in each group played one another in a round-robin, with the top two teams advancing to the knockout stage.

Group A

Group B

Group C

Group D

Knockout stage 

The top 2 teams from each pool advanced to the quarter-finals. All quarter-finalists will automatically qualify for the 2025 Rugby League World Cup.

Quarter-finals

Semi-finals

Final

Statistics

Final standings

Top try scorers

Top goal scorers

Top points scorers

Player discipline

Yellow cards

Red cards

See also
 2021 Women's Rugby League World Cup
 2021 Wheelchair Rugby League World Cup
 International rugby league in 2022
 Impact of the COVID-19 pandemic on rugby league

Notes

References

External links

 

 
World Cup
Rugby League World Cup
Rugby League World Cup
Rugby League World Cup
Rugby League World Cup